Daniel Mach (born December 5, 1955 in Perpignan — Perpinyà) was a member of the National Assembly of France.  He represented the Pyrénées-Orientales's 1st constituency from 2002 to 2012 as a member of the Union for a Popular Movement. He is the first politician to have spoken in Catalan in the National Assembly, saying:
'Senyora, els catalans són gent orgullosa, honesta i pacífica. La seva llengua és un dret i saben quins són els seus deures.'
"The catalans are a proud, honest and peaceful people. Their language is a right and they know what their responsibilities are."

References

1955 births
Living people
People from Perpignan
Union for French Democracy politicians
Union for a Popular Movement politicians
The Popular Right
Deputies of the 12th National Assembly of the French Fifth Republic
Deputies of the 13th National Assembly of the French Fifth Republic